Arunachalam or Arunachala is a Tamil male given name. Due to the Tamil tradition of using patronymic surnames it may also be a surname for males and females.

Notable people

Given name
Arunachalam or Arunasalam
 A. Arunachalam, Indian politician
 M. Arunachalam (born 1949), Hong Kong based businessman
 M. Arunachalam (1944–2004), Indian politician
 P. Arunachalam (1853–1924), Ceylonese civil servant and statesman
 Panchu Arunachalam (1941–2016), Indian writer, director, producer and lyricist
 Pon Arunachalam (born 1946), Indian writer 
 R. Arunachalam, Indian politician
 Subbiah Arunachalam (born 1941), Indian information consultant 
 Subbu Panchu Arunachalam (born 1969), Indian actor and film producer
 V. Arunachalam (1933–2004), Indian politician, activist, and writer
 V. S. Arunachalam, Indian politician
 V. S. R. Arunachalam, Indian scientist

Surname
Arunachala
 Arunachala Kavi (1711–1779), Indian poet and a composer
 Arunachala Sreenivasan (1909–1996), Indian nutritional scientist
 Arunachala Thevar, Indian politician
 Lalpet Arunachala Govindaraghava Aiyar (1867-1935), Indian lawyer, theosophist, independence activist and politician

Arunachalam or Arunasalam
 Arunchalam Aravind Kumar (born 1954), Sri Lankan trade unionist and politician
 Arunasalam Kumarathurai (born 1939), Sri Lankan founder of Kumarapuram
 Arunachalam Mahadeva (1885–1969), Ceylonese lawyer and politician
 Arunasalam Murugadoss (born 1974), Indian film director, producer, and screenwriter
 Arunachalam Muruganantham (born 1962), Indian social entrepreneur
 Arunasalam Namathevan (born 1996), Malaysian footballer
 Arunachalam Ponnambalam (1814–1887), Ceylonese government functionary, businessmen and philanthropist
 Arunachalam Sabapathy (1853–1924), Ceylonese newspaper editor and politician
 Arunasalam Thangathurai (1936–1997), Sri Lankan lawyer and politician
 Jaya Arunachalam (born 1935), Indian social worker

See also
 
 
 

Tamil masculine given names